Balalae Airport is a small civil airport on Balalae island operated by Solomon Airlines. It is located in the northwest of the Solomon Islands, part of the Shortland Island Group and south of Bougainville Island . It serves the nearby Shortland Islands and Fauro Island. It's a 1.75 km long sandy coral airstrip only 5 feet (or 1.5 meters) above sea level with a small customs area. It was built by prisoners of war, mostly British captured during the siege of Singapore, under the command of the Japanese during their occupation of the Solomons to protect the stronghold of Rabaul. In about June 1943, all Allied prisoners remaining on the island were killed and buried in mass graves. 436 bodies of unidentified soldiers were exhumed post-war. During 1943, Admiral Yamamoto planned to arrive on the airport from Rabaul to increase morale after the defeat at the Battle of Guadalcanal. He was shot down while passing Bougainville Island during Operation Vengeance, during the Guadalcanal campaign.

Airlines and destinations

References

External links
Solomon Airlines Routes

Airports in the Solomon Islands